Aqel (also Romanized as ‘Āqel; also known as Agir and ‘Aqīl) is a village in Kolah Boz-e Sharqi Rural District, in the Central District of Meyaneh County, East Azerbaijan Province, Iran. At the 2006 census, its population was 33, in 5 families.

References 

Populated places in Meyaneh County